Aalto University Executive Education Ltd (also known as Aalto EE) is a Finnish company that offers executive education and leadership development services in 12 countries. Aalto EE is owned by Aalto University.

Aalto EE has an office in Helsinki that coordinates operations in Europe and an office in Singapore for the Asia Pacific rim. In addition to Finland and Singapore, Aalto EE offers education programs in multiple locations worldwide.

History 
 Aalto University's two executive education providers, HSE Executive Education and TKK School of Business, merged on 1 April 2010. The name of the new company is Aalto University Executive Education Ltd (Aalto EE).
 In 2014 the activities of Aalto EE have been extended to include the commercial professional development activities of both Aalto University Professional Development (Aalto PRO) and the School of Business' Small Business Center (PYK).
 In 2017 Aalto EE acquired the entire share capital of FINVA Financial Education Ltd (Finva Finanssikoulutus Oy) from the Insurance Sector Development Association (Vakuutustiedon Kehittämissäätiö). The company is now part of the Aalto EE Group.

MBA and DBA programs 
Aalto University Executive Education organizes Aalto University's MBA programs: Aalto MBA Program and Aalto Executive MBA Program. Aalto EE also organizes Aalto Executive Doctor of Business Administration program (Aalto Executive DBA).

Open enrollment programs and customized solutions 
In addition to MBA programs, Aalto EE offers open enrollment programs for individuals and customized solutions for companies that need education tailored for the company needs. All Aalto EE's open programs offer a pathway to the Aalto MBA and Aalto Executive MBA programs.

Rankings 
Aalto EE is ranked in Financial Times Executive Education and Executive MBA rankings. Aalto EE ranked 42nd globally in the Financial Times Executive Education overall ranking in 2020. Aalto Executive MBA program ranked 78th in 2017.

Accreditations and networks 
As a part of Aalto University Aalto EE holds three business university accreditations AACSB (The Association to Advance Colleagiate Schools of Business, US), EQUIS (the European Quality Improvement System Label, European Foundation for Management Development (EFMD)) and AMBA (Association of MBAs, UK).

Aalto University and Aalto EE are part of various networks: UNICON (The International University Consortium for Executive Education), EFMD (The European Foundation for Management Development) and PIM (Partnership in International Management). Aalto University School of Business is also a member of CEMS, a network united by the leading European universities and major companies.

DBA dissertations 
 Suurnäkki, Margit (2019). Global Integration and Local Flexibility: Managing Contradictions in a Global Company - A Case Study of a Multi-National Service-Oriented Manufacturing Company. Aalto University Publication Series. BUSINESS+ECONOMY 4/2019. 978-952-60-8838-9 (printed) 978-952-60-8839-6 (pdf).
 Airaksinen-Aminoff, Pauliina (2018). Learning to Resolve Interpersonal Conflicts more Efficiently through Transformational Leadership: A Study on Coaching. Aalto University Publication Series. BUSINESS+ECONOMY.  (printed).  (pdf)
Lumme-Tuomala, Riitta (2017). Talent Management in the Humanitarian Aid Context. Aalto University Publication Series. BUSINESS+ECONOMY 1/2017.  (printed). (pdf)
 Kukkonen, Elina (2016). "Gaining more Value of Customer Relationships in the Digital Business Environment". Aalto University Publication Series. BUSINESS + ECONOMY 1/2016.  (printed).  (pdf)
 Ahdekivi, Eeva (2016). "Interactions between non-profit finance, governance and investment style". Aalto University Publication Series. BUSINESS + ECONOMY 2/2016.  (printed).  (pdf)

References

External links 
 

Executive Education
Companies based in Helsinki
Education companies established in 2010
Education companies of Europe
Finnish companies established in 2010
Service companies of Finland